Willan is a surname. Notable people with the surname include:

Anne Willan (born 1938), founded the Ecole de Cuisine La Varenne
Frank Willan (1915–1981), English pilot, Royal Air Force officer and Conservative politician
Frank Willan (rower) (1846–1931), English rower and Militia officer
Healey Willan (1880–1968), Anglo-Canadian organist and composer
Jason Willan, American soccer player
John Willan (1799–1869), English amateur cricketer
Robert Willan (1757–1812), English physician and the founder of dermatology as a medical specialty
Robert Hugh Willan (1882–1960), British soldier
Robert Joseph Willan (1878-1955), British surgeon and academic
Sophie Willan (born 1987/88), British comedian

Places
Willan Saddle (Sedlovina Willan, a place in the South Shetland Islands, Antarctica
Willan Nunatak, a mountain in the South Shetland Islands, Antarctica
Willans (disambiguation)
Willian (disambiguation)

Other
 Willan Publishing, a book publisher (acquired by Taylor & Francis in 2010)